Ofentse Nato (born 1 October 1989) is a Motswana professional footballer who plays as a defensive midfielder for Township Rollers and Botswana national team.

Club career
He began his professional career at a Botswana local team Gaborone United. After spending four years at the club, he joined South African club Bidvest Wits in July 2012 on a two-year deal. Nato joined Mpumalanga Black Aces on loan for the 2013–14 PSL season.

In 2014 it was announced that he would be loaned to the Spanish capital, where he will join the defending Spanish champions on a two-year loan deal. However, he would be loaned to Madrid’s satellite club in the Indian Super League, Atletico de Kolkata, for a 12-week period on his arrival, where he will be under the guidance of former Wits and Mamelodi Sundowns coach, Antonio Lopez Habas.

International

International goals
Scores and results list Botswana's goal tally first.

Honours
Atlético de Kolkata
Indian Super League: 2014, 2016

References

External links
 

1989 births
Living people
People from Ramotswa, Botswana
Association football midfielders
Botswana footballers
Botswana international footballers
2012 Africa Cup of Nations players
Gaborone United S.C. players
Bidvest Wits F.C. players
Mpumalanga Black Aces F.C. players
ATK (football club) players
Township Rollers F.C. players
Botswana expatriate footballers
Expatriate footballers in India
Expatriate soccer players in South Africa
Botswana expatriate sportspeople in South Africa